Bellezas Indomables (a.k.a. Untamed Beauties) is a Mexican telenovela/soap opera.

Story
Fernanda, Angeles and Soledad are three beautiful and courageous sisters, very different from each other, but with the same desire to compete for the love of their father, Rodrigo, a successful man who they met all their whims. Since they were very small when they lost their mother in what they know was an accident, they grew up under the care of Guadeloupe, their Nana, and next to Manuel, the son of Guadeloupe, with Fernanda, who has always felt a strong attraction but she has refused to the poor condition of the boy.

Berenice, the evil woman of Rodrigo, who is twice their age and who lives to manipulate and succeeds in becoming the wife of the father of three girls. The new marriage moved and the father becomes a shadow for their daughters. Berenice slowly poisons Rodrigo and his health deteriorates.  Angeles, already desperate for not seeing her father, caught their stepmother and Gregorio, her long time partner, kissing. In the midst of despair, Gregorio asks his bodyguard, Diego, who will do anything to protect his daughter, to kill Angeles. He goes after Angeles and was ordered to kill her, but he can’t follow through. He lets her live in his secret house where he cares and protects her. Realizing that her sister Fernanda was worried when she does not appear anymore, she then discovered her father died in a tragedy: Rodrigo has died.

The lives of the girls are changing radically and was stripped of all their property, a situation that takes advantage of the offer to Berenice and Gregory for their care in exchange for being lovers. Fernanda still loves Manuel in silent, but accepts the plan to avenge her father and enters into poverty. She entered a convent to finish high school away from so much suffering. Meanwhile, Fernanda starts a business clothing with the money Gregorio gave to her and support in continuing for Manuel, who in any circumstance is willing to help them rebuild their lives. It is there, amid the daily struggles and hidden affection, which strengthens the beautiful love that exists between them.

Gradually Fernanda takes courage to confront Gregory and Berenice, search for her sisters, live without chains and continually love Manuel.

Cast
Claudia Álvarez            - MARIA FERNANDA URQUILLO
Yahir                  - MANUEL VILLAZÓN
Cynthia Vázquez           - MARÍA ÁNGELES URQUILLO / ANNA HERNANDEZ
Marcela Ruiz               - MARÍA ÁNGELES URQUILLO
Carlos Torres              - DIEGO LOPEZ
Natalia Farias             - MARIA SOLEDAD URQUILLO
Fernando Alonso            - IGNACIO TORREJÓN
Tomás Goros                - GREGORIO TORREJÓN
Betty Monroe               - BERENICE DÍAZ OJEDA viuda de URQUILLO
Alberto Casanova           - JUAN LOPEZ
Carmen Delgado             - CARMEN SEGURA DE LOPEZ
Mayra Rojas                - GUADALUPE VILLAZÓN
Fernando Sarfatti          - RODRIGO URQUILLO
Angélica Magaña          - LOURDES
María de la Fuente         - ROXANA
Eduardo Reza               - LUIS
Sylvia Saenz               - BRENDA
Claudia Cervantes          - VIRGINIA
Karla Rico                - SISTER VICTORIA
Lariza Mendizabal          - SISTER ISABEL
Andrea Escalona            - MARA
Nancy Barrera              - ROSITA LOPEZ
Adrian Herrera             - PABLITO
Aline Hernández            - SABRINA
Raúl Osorio                - JÍMENEZ
Joejenina Transporte       - GABRIELLA

Broadcast international

Asia and Pacific 

 Bellezas Indomables, also known as Untamed Beauties, was successfully launched in the Philippines via TV5 (replacing ABC-5) last August 11, 2008 dubbed in Tagalog.

Africa
Bellezas Indomable, was  launched in Kenya in 2012 by KTN dubbed in English

Americas 

 Bellezas Indomables was successfully launched in Uruguay via VTV from April 12 to October 15, 2010 Monday to Friday at 17:00.
 Bellezas Indomables was successfully launched in Paraguay via Paravisión from September 14, 2009 to April 15, 2010 Monday to Friday at 12:30. Reruns of Bellezas Indomables via VTV Plus (Channels 8 and 706 from VCC).
 Bellezas Indomables was successfully launched in Argentina via CN23 from January 4 to June 3, 2010 Monday to Friday at 17:00. Reruns of  Bellezas Indomables via Vivra (HD signal only in the Channel 41.1 in Digital Terrestrial Televisión or DTT).

2007 telenovelas
2007 Mexican television series debuts
2008 Mexican television series endings
Mexican telenovelas
Spanish-language telenovelas
TV Azteca telenovelas